Rangunia Government College is a private college in Rangunia Upazila, Chittagong District, Bangladesh. It was founded in 1963. It is the ---- college established in Bangladesh after Chittagong College.

History 
Rangunia College was established in the centre of Rangunia Upazilla in 1963 to spread the light of education in the north-east Chittagong. We would like to thank Mr. Hazi Moulana Ahmed, Mr. Wakil Ahmed Talukder, Dr. Binoy Vushon Dev and Mr. Shantosh Bhuson Das who made their great effort to establish this college. Thirty five kilometers away from Chittagong city this institution is situated on the bank of Karnaphuly surrounded by a panoramic view. With the help of local people specially the local patronizes of learning, social workers, political figures this institution have crossed a long way of fifty years successfully. This centre of learning started its activities in July 1963 with the H.S.C course. In 1965 its full journey was started as a Degree College after getting the approval from Dhaka University. Honours course in Political Science and Management have started recently.
The college code number is 4321 under National University. H.S.C code is 3525. Secondary and Higher Education Directorate Code number is 0210043201.
This centre of learning is working as a lighthouse of the people of hill tracts and the remote areas of Chittagong from the very beginning. This institution is enriched with science laboratory, large library with a large number of books. For the mental development here is a “Debating Club” for the students. For physical development here is a large sports ground with basketball court that is very rare in the rural area. In the field of education, culture and sports this college has gained a unique position in Chittagong.
For the students there are five two-storied buildings covering two acres of land, one administrative building, residential area for the teachers and staffs, dormitory for the bachelor teachers, a large pond covering 01 acre of land, a large play ground of 023 acres. Besides this college is surrounded by 880 acres of cultivable land of its own.|Colleges in Chittagong, Bangladesh.

References

Colleges in Chittagong
Educational institutions established in 1963
1963 establishments in East Pakistan